Dudinka (Nenets: Тут'ын, Tutꜧyn) is a town on the Yenisei River and the administrative center of Taymyrsky Dolgano-Nenetsky District of Krasnoyarsk Krai, Russia. It used to be the administrative center of Taymyr Autonomous Okrug, which was merged into Krasnoyarsk Krai on January 1, 2007. Population:

History
It was founded in 1667 as a winter settlement connected to Mangazeya. In 1930 it was designated the administrative center of the Taimyr Dolgan-Nenets National Region. In 1935, the polar explorer Otto Schmidt recommended that the settlement be expanded into a town. By 1937, the port facilities and a railroad to Norilsk were completed. Town status was granted in 1951.

Administrative and municipal status
Within the framework of administrative divisions, Dudinka serves as the administrative center of Taymyrsky Dolgano-Nenetsky District. As an administrative division, it is, together with five rural localities, incorporated within Taymyrsky Dolgano-Nenetsky District as the district town of Dudinka. As a municipal division, the district town of Dudinka is incorporated within Taymyrsky Dolgano-Nenetsky Municipal District as Dudinka Urban Settlement.

Economy
Dudinka processes and sends cargo via Norilsk railway to the Norilsk Mining and Smelting Factory and also ships non-ferrous metals, coal and ore. In 1969, the Messoyakha-Dudinka-Norilsk natural gas pipeline was laid.

Dudinka is a port in the lower reaches of the Yenisei River, accessible to seagoing ships. The town is served by the Dudinka Airport.

Infrastructure

It is a grounded mast with a rhombic cage antenna.

Climate
Despite lying more than two degrees above the Arctic Circle, Dudinka has a subarctic climate (Köppen climate classification Dfc) with short, mild summers and severely cold winters. Average high temperature even in May is below freezing and short summer starts in mid June and lasts only 2 months. Precipitation is moderate; it falls mostly as rain in summer and mainly as snow throughout the rest of the year.

Sports and entertainment
The Taymyr ice arena is the newly built ice hockey, figure skating and curling facility in Dudinka. It is the northernmost ice arena in the world that is fit for holding high-level, international events. The spectators capacity of the arena is 350 seats. The 2017 CCT Arctic Cup took place in the city of Dudinka at the Taymyr ice arena on May 18–22, 2017. It was the first-ever international curling tournament among women teams beyond the Arctic Circle. The event was held with participation of 8 strongest teams from the northern countries, located at the 69th parallel. Participant teams included Russian National Team, Team Krasnoyarsk, Team Canada, Team USA, Team Finland. A wild card from the Organizing Committee was granted to Team Switzerland. Since 2017 Dudinka becomes the place where the international Arctic Curling Cup tournament takes place annually. The test event for this tournament was TAYMYR CURLING CUP 2016. The first-ever curling tournament among men teams beyond the Arctic Circle took place in Dudinka on May 26–30, 2016. The tournament was held as a test event for the Arctic Curling Cup. Six strongest Russian men teams took part in the event. In 2018 Dudinka held the final tour of the international Arctic Curling Cup. 10 strongest teams, 3 of which were Russian, were competing in double-mixed. Maria Komarova and Daniel Goryachov received bronze medals in this tournament.

Notable people
Olga Martynova, poet

Petr Yan, mixed martial artist, former UFC Bantamweight Champion

See also
Chief Directorate of the Northern Sea Route
Yenisei Gulf

References

Notes

Sources

External links

Official website of Dudinka 
Dudinka Business Directory 
Facts about Dudinka

Cities and towns in Krasnoyarsk Krai
Taymyrsky Dolgano-Nenetsky District
Closed cities
Port cities and towns in Russia
Populated places of Arctic Russia
1667 establishments in Russia
Road-inaccessible communities of Krasnoyarsk Krai
Populated places on the Yenisei River
North Siberian Lowland